Dark Eyes (French: Les yeux noirs) is a 1935 French drama film directed by Viktor Tourjansky and starring Harry Baur, Simone Simon and Jean-Pierre Aumont.

The film's sets were designed by the art director Eugène Lourié.

Cast
 Harry Baur as Ivan Ivanovitch Petroff 
 Simone Simon as Tania  
 Jean-Pierre Aumont as Karpoff  
 Jean-Max as Roudine  
 Christiane Ribes as Une demi-mondaine  
 Jeanne Brindeau as La gouvernante  
 Max Maxudian 
 Pierre Labry as Le noceur  
 André Dubosc as Le maître d'hôtel  
 Guy Sloux as Le fêtard 
 Nine Assia as Lucie  
 Viviane Romance as La comtesse  
 Georges Paulais 
 Jacques Berlioz as Le directeur  
 Adrienne Trenkel  
 Maxime Fabert as Un convive  
 Claude Lehmann as Un jeune officier  
 Marguerite de Morlaye 
 Émile Genevois 
 Léon Arvel as Un serveur du restaurant  
 Raymond Aimos as Un serveur du restaurant  
 Rodolphe Marcilly 
 Pierre Athon 
 André Siméon

References

Bibliography
 Dayna Oscherwitz & MaryEllen Higgins. The A to Z of French Cinema. Scarecrow Press, 2009.

External links
 

1935 films
1935 drama films
1930s French-language films
French drama films
Films directed by Victor Tourjansky
Films scored by Michel Michelet
Films set in Russia
French black-and-white films
1930s French films